East Indian Creek Bridge is a historic structure located southeast of Nevada, Iowa, United States. N.M. Stark and Company of Des Moines started building bridges for Story County beginning in 1902, and then they held an exclusive contract until 1913 when the Iowa Legislature banned the practice. Stark constructed this concrete Luten arch structure in 1912 for $4,462 as part of a multi-bridge contract. This was the longest concrete arch built by Stark in Story County. It was listed on the National Register of Historic Places in 1998.

See also
 
 
 
 
 List of bridges on the National Register of Historic Places in Iowa
 National Register of Historic Places listings in Jones County, Iowa

References

External links

Bridges completed in 1912
Bridges in Story County, Iowa
National Register of Historic Places in Story County, Iowa
Road bridges on the National Register of Historic Places in Iowa
Arch bridges in Iowa
Concrete bridges in the United States